Michael-Ray Pallares González (born December 15, 1980) is a professional tennis player from the Dominican Republic.

He was a member of the Dominican Republic Davis Cup team and represented his country at the Central American and Caribbean Games.

Biography

Michael-Ray Pallares González is a second cousin once-removed of the Dominican Mirabal sisters.

Junior career

As a junior, Michael-Ray was a two-time USTA National Champion winning the USTA National Interscholastic Championships in Lexington, Kentucky as well as the USTA National Port Washington Easter Classic at the famed Port Washington Tennis Academy in Port Washington, New York.

Past winners of these events include Jim Courier, John McEnroe, Butch Buchholz, Arthur Ashe, Roscoe Tanner, Harold Solomon, Bryan Shelton, Chris Woodruff, Luke Jensen, Brian Baker, and Donald Young amongst others.

College career

Michael-Ray accepted an athletic scholarship to attend the University of Alabama in Tuscaloosa, Alabama where he played for the Alabama Crimson Tide men's tennis team which was ranked Top 10 in NCAA Division 1 Men's Tennis.  In 2003, he was voted the Most Improved Player and was an instrumental part of the team that advanced to the NCAA Sweet 16 in Athens, Georgia.  He graduated from the University of Alabama with a Bachelor of Business Administration.

Professional career

ATP World Tour

Pallares González turned professional in 2004, competing predominantly on the ITF Men's Circuit and ATP Challenger Tour.

He's held an ATP ranking in singles & doubles for over ten years, posting wins over six players who were each ranked inside the ATP Top-300 and advanced to the doubles final of the $15K Algeria F3 Futures Tournament in 2011.

Doubles: (1 Runner-up)

Davis Cup

Michael-Ray Pallares González has represented the Dominican Republic as a member of four Davis Cup selections, posting a 1-0 record competing in the 2004 Davis Cup Americas Zone Groups II.

Davis Cup: Singles (1-0)

European League Club Tennis

While playing European League Club Tennis for teams in Italy (TC Volpago), Germany (SV Blankenese e.V.), Austria (TC Grün Weiß Steyr) & (UTC Casa Moda Steyr), and France (Racing Club de France), Michael-Ray compiled a 57-13 record, helping his teams get promoted four times in their respective leagues.

European League Club Tennis: Record (57-13)

USTA Tournaments

The United States Tennis Association Open Tournaments are the most competitive on the USTA schedule and provide a high level of competition and prize money for experienced players. While competing at the Men's Open Singles division, Michael-Ray achieved a #1 Final Ranking 7 times in 6 different sections. The USTA is made up of 17 individual sections, each representing distinct geographic locations throughout the United States.

USTA Men's Open Singles: Rankings

Coaching career

Michael-Ray Pallares González is the Owner & Head Professional of Crown Elite Tennis Academy, a high performance tennis academy specializing in junior development in Tampa, Florida.

He has served as Professional Tour Coach and/or hitting partner for several Top 10 ATP & WTA Players including Nicolas Almagro, John Isner, Vera Zvonareva, Alla Kudryavtseva & Kristina Brandi.

He also served as Director of Tennis for the Panamanian Tennis Federation, Turkmenistan Tennis Federation and Guam National Tennis Federation as the International Tennis Federation Expert Coach undertaking the Development of National Sport Structure, creating an action plan to strengthen the tennis program approved by the NOC, International Olympic Committee and Olympic Solidarity.

Philanthropy
Michael-Ray Pallares González founded One Love Tennis Inc. in 2011, which is a non-profit organization designed to reach underprivileged and low income youth through affordable tennis, education, and fitness.  He has travelled all over the world, organizing Play-Day events designed to introduce kids to tennis providing them with the opportunity to continue to develop and enhance their skills.  Play-Days are a welcoming way for kids to experience the social and competitive aspects of tennis, promoting a sense of achievement through a fun and spirited atmosphere.

Africa
In July 2016, Pallares González traveled to Southern Africa and teamed up with Jane Kaye-Bailey's Butterfly Tree Charity along with John Nomad's Nomad Sports Academy to conduct an Exhibition and Play-Day event for a group of 20 orphans from the Mukuni Village in Livingstone - Southern Province, Zambia. Michael-Ray's second trip to the African continent came in May 2018, as he traveled to Ethiopia located in the Horn of Africa. He hosted a “Play-Day” event in collaboration with the Senai Foundation, for a group of 15 children from Hannah’s Orphans Home in the heart of Addis Ababa, most of which have tragically lost their parents to either the HIV/AIDS epidemic or imprisonment of their parents. Pallares González next visited the East African country of Zimbabwe in June 2018, to host a tennis academy “Stage & Clinic” for a group of 25 children from Mutasa Primary School in the Highfield township of Harare. The event was held at the historic Harare Sports Club in collaboration with the National Tennis Federation of Zimbabwe, the Zimbabwe Olympic Committee, and the Zimbabwe Sports & Recreation Commission. That same month, Michael-Ray traveled to Rwanda, one of the smallest countries on the African mainland located in the Great Lakes Region of Central Africa. He collaborated with the Rwanda Tennis Federation and the Rwanda National Olympic and Sports Committee to host a training session for ten of the top juniors in the nation along with several national coaches to assist in further developing the sport of tennis in Rwanda, providing opportunities for young players and coaches to gain knowledge and have access to tennis supplies. The event took place during the final weekend of the Genocide Memorial Tennis Tournament at the National Training Center based out of the Stade National Amahoro in Kigali, Rwanda's capital and largest city.

Asia
In December 2015, North Okkalapa Township located in the eastern part of Yangon, Myanmar in southeast Asia was host to an event.  The event was held at the Damayaketa Monastery for 25 children from the Myat Mingalar Orphanage.

Australia and Oceania

In September 2018, in collaboration with the Guam National Tennis Federation and the Guam National Olympic Committee, Michael-Ray organized two events on the island of Guam, which is an unincorporated and organized territory of the United States in Micronesia in the western Pacific Ocean.  It is the westernmost point and territory of the United States, along with the Northern Mariana Islands. The first Play-Day event was held for 20 girls and women in partnership with the Guaiya Todu Foundation, a non-profit organization striving to promote the sport of tennis to aspire and empower girls and women of all ages. Pallares González then partnered with the Mañelu Foundation, a nonprofit institution that helps children reach their potential through professionally supported mentoring relationships, to host a Play-Day event for a group of 30 children.

Europe
In June 2017, Pallares González traveled to the Southern European island country of Malta and collaborated with the Salesian Pastoral Youth Service of the Salesians of Don Bosco and the Ursuline Sisters of the Ursulines to host a Play-Day event for a group of 15 children from the St Patrick’s boys’ home in Sliema.  In September 2017, Michael-Ray once again travelled to Europe, this time to the Southeastern European country of Romania.  The Play-Day event took place in the residential quarter of Moșilor located in Bucharest's Sector 2, Romania's capital and largest city.  He partnered with the Saint Macrina Orphanage and the Romanian Churches Ecumenical Association to host the event for a group of 15 children living at the residential shelter. In May 2018, Pallares González returned to Malta to host an exhibition and Play-Day event at the historic Marsa Sports Club for a group of 20 children from the St Patrick’s boys’ home in Sliema.

North America
In December 2016, the Clayview Country Club in Kansas City, Missouri was the first site in the United States to host an event.  In October 2017, Michael-Ray collaborated with the Rockhurst University Men's & Women's Tennis Teams to host another event at historic Hyde Park, Kansas City.  These Play-Day events were held for a group of 10 children who - by no fault of their own - were unable to remain in their homes and were placed in The Salvation Army Children's Shelter due to either a family crisis or child abuse, including issues of physical, sexual, emotional and psychological abuse, or severe neglect.  That same month, the Hanscom-Brandeis Indoor Tennis Center located within the historic Hanscom Park neighborhood in Midtown Omaha, Nebraska hosted an event for a group of 12 children from Completely KIDS, an organization that educates and assists youth and their families, via school and homeless shelter partnerships.  In July 2017, Michael-Ray's second event in the Midwest took place in Fargo, the most populous city in the state of North Dakota.  The Play-Day event was held for a group of 12 children temporarily living at the YWCA Cass Clay Children’s Emergency shelter. In December 2017, Michael-Ray teamed-up with Fundación del Empresariado Sonorense (FESAC), the Border Community Alliance (BCA) and the Border Youth Tennis Exchange (BYTE) to host the first Play-Day event in Mexico. The event was held for a group of 45 children living at the Orfanato Casa de Elizabeth A.C. Children's Home in the municipal seat of Ímuris, located in the Imuris Municipality in the north of the Mexican state of Sonora.

Central America & Caribbean
In September 2017, Michael-Ray teamed-up with Fundación Sigue mis Pasos to host the first Play-Day event in his home country. The event was held for a group of 15 children living at the Orfanato Casa Amor y Restauración Hermosa Children's Home in the Brisas del Este sector of Santo Domingo Este, a municipality and provincial capital of the Santo Domingo province in the Dominican Republic. That same month, he collaborated with Grupo Puntacana to host his second event in the Dominican Republic, this time for a group of 30 ball-boys at the Oscar de la Renta Tennis Center located in the Puntacana Resort and Club community of Punta Cana, La Altagracia Province. In December 2018, Michael-Ray returned to the Orfanato Casa Amor y Restauración Hermosa Children's Home in the Brisas del Este sector of Santo Domingo Este, to donate tennis equipment to the shelter as well as take part in a special Christmas Dinner where more than 500 children from several nearby orphanages attended.

South America
In March 2016, Michael-Ray teamed-up with Tennis for Colombia to host a Play-Day event for a group of 10 ball-boys in the rural neighborhood of Puerto Caldas, a municipality of Pereira, Colombia in the foothills of the Andes located in northwest South America.  In March 2017, his second event in Colombia took place in the town and municipality of Jamundí, (15 mi) south of Cali, the capital of the Valle del Cauca department, and the most populous city in southwest Colombia.  The Play-Day event was held for a group of 8 ball-boys in collaboration with Las Mercedes Campestre Tennis Club.

Other Initiatives

Mental Health
In October 2017 and December 2018, Michael-Ray collaborated with occupational therapist Debbie Kolarik and recreational therapist Ron Tankel to organize an event and create a program for behavioral health clients at the New Frontiers tennis program at Truman Medical Center located in the Hospital Hill neighborhood of Kansas City, Missouri.

Child Literacy
In September 2018, Michael-Ray visited the St. John's School, an international college preparatory school located in the Tumon area of Tamuning, Guam, United States serving students from pre-kindergarten through 12th grade to celebrate and take part in National Reading Group Month. Pallares Gonzalez visited and read to St. John's 5th Grade Class and donated tennis equipment enabling students to familiarize themselves with the sport and further engage themselves in healthy competition amongst their peers.

References

External links

1980 births
Living people
Dominican Republic male tennis players
Alabama Crimson Tide men's tennis players
White Dominicans